Alleyne is an English-language surname. People with the name include:

 Aaliyah Alleyne (born 1994), West Indian cricketer
 Alleyne baronets
 Anthony Alleyne (born 1993), Barbadian cricketer
 Archie Alleyne (1933–2015), Canadian jazz musician
 Brian Alleyne (born 1943), Dominican judge
 Cameron Chesterfield Alleyne (1880-1955), Barbados-born American bishop of the African Methodist Episcopal Zion Church
 Camille Wardrop Alleyne (born 1966), Trinidad-born American aerospace engineer, space scientist, and science ambassador
 Damian Alleyne (born 1983), Barbadian swimmer
 David Alleyne (born 1976), English cricketer
 Ebony Alleyne (born 1983), British singer
 George Alleyne (born 1932), Barbadian academic
 Hartley Alleyne (born 1957), Barbadian cricketer
 Haynes Gibbes Alleyne (1813-1882), Barbadian born, Australian doctor and ichthyologist
 Jade Alleyne (born 2001), British actress
 Kerry Alleyne (born 1983), Dominican footballer
 Mabel Alleyne (1896–1961), English wood engraver
 Mark Alleyne (born 1968), English cricketer
 Mervyn C. Alleyne (born 1933), Trinidadian linguist
 Shagari Alleyne (born 1984), American basketball player
 Sonita Alleyne (born 1968), Master of Jesus College, Cambridge and British television producer
 Thomas Alleyne, 16th-century English clergyman
 Thyra Alleyne (1875–1954), English academic

See also 
 Alleyn
 Alleyne v. United States, a U.S. Supreme Court case